Neighborhood House may refer to:

Places
 Lenox Hill Neighborhood House, multi-service community-based organization in Manhattan, New York City, US
 Neighborhood House (Louisville, Kentucky), US
 Neighborhood House (Portland, Oregon), US, listed on the National Register of Historic Places
 North East Neighborhood House, Minneapolis, Minnesota, US
 The Shack Neighborhood House, Morgantown, West Virginia, US
 Trinity Neighborhood House, historic brick townhouse in East Boston, Massachusetts, US

Illinois
 Erie Neighborhood House, social service agency in Chicago, Illinois, US
 Neighborhood House (Chicago), US, settlement movement organization in Englewood neighborhood of Chicago, Illinois, US
 Lessie Bates Davis Neighborhood House, social services organization in East St. Louis, Illinois, US
 Onward Neighborhood House, non-profit organization in Chicago, Illinois, US

Other
 Neighborhood House, 1936 American comedy film